Adalbert Wirkhaus (17 May 1880 Väägvere, Sootaga Parish, Tartu County – 19 December 1961 Fort Lauderdale, Florida, USA) was an Estonian composer and conductor. He was the first Estonian professional conductor.

Life
Wirkhaus' father was the musician and Estonian social movement figure David Otto Wirkhaus. In 1908, he graduated from Leipzig Conservatory in conducting and in composition speciality.

From 1908 to 1912, he was a music director of the Estonia Theatre. 1912–1917, he was a music director of Valga Säde Society. In 1919, he founded (with August Nieländer) Tartu Music School.

In 1944, he fled with his family from the advancing Red Army to Germany. Since 1949, he lived in Fort Lauderdale, USA. His son was composer and conductor Taavo Virkhaus and his nephew was composer, choir director and organist Leonhard Virkhaus.

Works

 operetta "Jaaniöö" ('Midsummer Night'; 1911). First Estonian operetta.
 operetta "Kevadtormid"  ('Spring Storms'; 1934)

References

1880 births
1960 deaths
20th-century Estonian composers
Estonian conductors (music)
University of Music and Theatre Leipzig alumni
Estonian World War II refugees
Estonian emigrants to the United States
People from Tartu Parish